Little from the Fish Shop is a Czech animated film written and directed by Jan Balej.  The film is loosely based on Hans Christian Andersen's story "The Little Mermaid". It uses puppets animated in stop motion.

Plot
This story tells the tale of the fish king and his family, who are forced to move from the sea and set up fish shop. The youngest daughter, Little, then falls in love with a human man.

Production
The film was produced through Miracle Film with co-production support from companies in Slovakia and France. It received eight million Czech crowns from the Czech State Cinematographic Fund, 90,000 euro from the Slovak Audiovisual Fund and 250,000 euro from Eurimages. The full budget corresponded to 1.5 million euro. Principal photography took 410 days. The film was released in 2015.

See also
 2015 in film
 Cinema of the Czech Republic

References

External links
 Official website
 

2015 animated films
2015 films
Czech animated films
2010s Czech-language films
Films based on The Little Mermaid
Films scored by Yann Tiersen
2010s stop-motion animated films
Czech animated romance films
Czech animated drama films